The Saturn Award for Best Costume Design is one of the annual awards given by the Academy of Science Fiction, Fantasy and Horror Films. The Saturn Awards, which are the oldest film-specialized awards to reward science fiction, fantasy, and horror achievements (the Hugo Award for Best Dramatic Presentation is the oldest award for science fiction and fantasy films), included the category for the first time at the 4th Saturn Awards in 1977.

Winners and nominees

1970s

1980s

1990s

2000s

2010s

2020s

Multiple nominations
13 nominations
 Colleen Atwood

10 nominations
 Bob Ringwood

7 nominations
 Kym Barrett

6 nominations
 Jany Temime

5 nominations
 Alexandra Byrne
 Joanna Johnston
 Michael Kaplan

4 nominations
 Jenny Beavan
 John Bloomfield
 Ngila Dickson
 Robert Fletcher
 Lindy Hemming
 Judianna Makovsky
 Sandy Powell
 Penny Rose
 Anna B. Sheppard
 Richard Taylor
 Michael Wilkinson

3 nominations
 Trisha Biggar
 Milena Canonero
 Jean-Pierre Dorleac
 Jacqueline Durran
 Louise Mingenbach
 John Mollo
 Isis Mussenden
 Gabriella Pescucci
 Arianne Phillips
 Joseph A. Porro
 Emma Porteous
 Sammy Sheldon
 Albert Wolsky
 Janty Yates

2 nominations
 Theoni V. Aldredge
 Deena Appel
 Richard Bruno
 Vin Burnham
 David Crossman
 Glyn Dillon
 Ingrid Ferrin
 Jean Paul Gaultier
 Eiko Ishioka
 Catherine Martin
 Anthony Mendleson
 Ellen Mirojnick
 Norma Moriceau
 Ruth Myers
 Patricia Norris
 Rosanna Norton
 Wendy Partridge
 Beatrix Aruna Pasztor
 Erica Edell Phillips
 Anthony Powell
 Mayes C. Rubeo
 Deborah Lynn Scott
 Theadora Van Runkle
 Marilyn Vance
 Mary E. Vogt
 Julie Weiss
 Jacqueline West
 Timmy Yip

Multiple wins
3 wins
 Colleen Atwood

2 wins
 Trisha Biggar
 Alexandra Byrne
 Ngila Dickson
 Jean-Pierre Dorleac
 Jacqueline Durran
 Bob Ringwood

External links
 
 IMDb: 4th, 5th, 6th, 7th, 8th, 9th, 10th, 11th, 12th, 13th, 14th, 15th, 16th, 17th, 18th, 19th, 20th, 21st, 22nd, 23rd, 24th, 25th, 26th, 27th, 28th, 29th, 30th, 31st, 32nd, 33rd, 34th, 35th, 36th, 37th, 38th, 39th, 40th, 41st, 42nd, 43rd, 44th, 45th, 46th, 47th

Costume
Awards for film costume design